The Peshawar Zalmi is a franchise cricket team that represents Peshawar in the Pakistan Super League. They are one of the five teams that had a competition in the 2017 Pakistan Super League. The team was captained by Darren Sammy, and they stand on first position after winning four matches from their eight matches in the PSL 2017. The team won the tournament after defeating Quetta Gladiators in final.

Squad
Peshawar traded Aamer Yamin for Sohaib Maqsood of Lahore Qalandars during the off-season. During the 2017 Pakistan Super League players draft they retained 10 players and signed eight, including Overseas players Shakib Al Hasan, Eoin Morgan, Chris Jordan and Alex Hales. Shakib and Tamim were not available for selection during the initial stage of tournament due to national duties. Later Alex Hales and Shakib were replaced with Tillakaratne Dilshan and Marlon Samuels and Mohammad Shahzad was replaced with Andre Fletcher while Tamim Iqbal was replaced with Samit Patel.

Season summary
In their first game of PSL 2017, Peshawar Zalmi lost to the Islamabad United by 7 wickets. In their next game against Karachi Kings, Zalmi won by 7 wickets in pursuit of 120. Eoin Morgan starred in the chase with an unbeaten innings of 80 off 57 balls. Following this the Zalmi were involved in a low-scoring thriller with the Lahore Qalandars that saw the former collapse in the chase of just 60 runs before getting over the line with 3 wickets to spare.

As the tournament moved to Sharjah, Zalmi's first game against Quetta Gladiators was abandoned after repeated showers and the two teams shared the points from the bout. Following this, against Islamabad United, the Zalmis lost a hard-fought game that went down to the last ball. After being put in to bat by United, Zalmi could only manage a below-par score of 137 and never really got going. But the team's bowlers bowled exceedingly well to make a contest out of it. In their final game of the Sharjah leg, the Zalmis continued their losing streak after being beaten by Karachi Kings in a thrilling contest. Setting up a target of 175, the Kings had the Zalmis reduced to 69–6 before Shahid Afridi and Darren Sammy combined in a 70-run partnership that almost won the game for the Zalmis. However, they couldn't see the game through as the Zalmis fell short by 9 runs.

With the tournament shifting back to Dubai, the Zalmis registered consecutive wins against Lahore Qalandars and Quetta Gladiators respectively. Against the Qalandars, the team put up a target of 167 and then successful defended it after inducing a batting collapse of 5 wickets for 6 runs from the opposition. In the end prevailing by 17 runs and securing a play-off spot. But with the Galdiators, the team suffered a batting collapse of their own. Chasing a below-par total of 129, the Zalmis were at one time reduced to 52–6 before a vintage performance from Shahid Afridi, who scored 45 off 23 balls, ensured that his team won with 2 wickets left intact. The team thus qualified Qualifier 1, but were defeated by Quetta Gladiators by 1 run in a close encounter, despite the 77 runs innings of Mohammad Hafeez.

Season standings
Peshawar Zalmi topped the points table of 2017 Pakistan Super League.

References

2017 in Khyber Pakhtunkhwa
2017 Pakistan Super League
Zalmi in 2017
2017